Robert Earl Taylor (born November 14, 1960) is a former NFL offensive tackle who played eight seasons with the Tampa Bay Buccaneers. He was selected by the Philadelphia Eagles in the twelfth round of the 1982 NFL Draft.

Taylor signed with the Buccaneers in 1986 after coming to Tampa on a vacation with his wife. He went to the team facility to ask for a tryout which was granted, and was signed from the tryout.

References

1960 births
Living people
People from St. Charles, Illinois
Sportspeople from Kane County, Illinois
American football offensive tackles
Northwestern Wildcats football players
Tampa Bay Buccaneers players
Chicago Blitz players
Ed Block Courage Award recipients